Alan Charles Gilmore (born 1944 in Greymouth, New Zealand) is a New Zealand astronomer and a discoverer of minor planets and other astronomical objects.

He is credited by the Minor Planet Center with the discovery of 41 minor planets, all but one in collaboration with his wife Pamela M. Kilmartin. Both astronomers are also active nova- and comet-hunters.

Until their retirement in 2014, Gilmore and Kilmartin worked at Mount John University Observatory (Department of Physics and Astronomy, University of Canterbury, Christchurch, New Zealand), where they  continue to receive observing time. He is also a member of the Organizing Committee of IAU Commission 6, which oversees the dissemination of information and the assignment of credit for astronomical discoveries. The Commission still bears the name "Astronomical Telegrams", even though telegrams are no longer used.

On 2007 August 30, Gilmore discovered his first periodic comet, P/2007 Q2.

The Eunomia asteroid 2537 Gilmore was named in his honor, while his wife is honored with the outer main-belt asteroid 3907 Kilmartin.

Gilmore talks on astronomy on the Radio New Zealand program Nights' Science.  In May 2019 he and his wife were honored by New Zealand post with a stamp in its New Zealand Space Pioneers series.

List of discovered minor planets

See also 
 Gary Hug
 Miguel Itzigsohn

References

External links 
 Alan Gilmore, UC SPARK - University of Canterbury

20th-century New Zealand astronomers
21st-century New Zealand astronomers
Discoverers of asteroids
Discoverers of comets

Living people
1944 births